Aron Domżała (born 1 August 1989) is a Polish rally raid racer who currently competes in the UTV category. He won the 2016 FIA Cross Country Rally World Cup in the T3 class.

References

1989 births
Living people
People from Barlinek
Polish motorcycle racers
Polish rally drivers
Dakar Rally drivers
Dakar Rally motorcyclists
Off-road motorcycle racers